Instant Replay is a football video game published in 1987 by Software Innovations.

Gameplay
Instant Replay is a game in which the player can replay full NFL seasons using the entire statistics base from 1986.

Reception
Wyatt Lee reviewed the game for Computer Gaming World, and stated that "not exactly a game, but it is worthy of note for those who like to replay full seasons of NFL games using the computer vs. computer mode."

References

American football video games